James Henry "Jim" Vickers (7 December 1922 – 6 December 2016) was an Indian hurdler. He competed in the men's 110 metres hurdles at the 1948 Summer Olympics.

References

External links
 

1922 births
2016 deaths
Sportspeople from Thrissur
Anglo-Indian people
Athletes (track and field) at the 1948 Summer Olympics
Indian male hurdlers
Olympic athletes of India
Indian emigrants to Australia
Australian people of Anglo-Indian descent